In anatomy, rugae are a series of ridges produced by folding of the wall of an organ. Most commonly rugae refers to the gastric rugae of the internal surface of the stomach.

Function

A purpose of the gastric rugae is to allow for expansion of the stomach after the consumption of foods and liquids. This expansion increases the volume of the stomach to hold larger amounts of food. The folds also result in greater surface area, allowing the stomach to absorb nutrients more quickly.

Location
Rugae can appear in the following locations in humans:
 Wrinkles of the labia and scrotum
 Hard palate immediately behind the upper anterior teeth
 Inside the urinary bladder
 Vagina
 Gallbladder
 Inside the stomach
 Inside the rectum

Difference between rugae and plicae
With few exceptions (e.g. the scrotum), rugae are only evident when an organ or tissue is deflated or relaxed. For example, rugae are evident within the stomach when it is deflated. However, when the stomach distends, the rugae unfold to allow for the increase in volume. On the other hand, plicae remain folded regardless of distension as is evident within the plicae of the small intestine walls.

References

Anatomy
Tissues (biology)

ja:襞